The 1999–2000 Logan Cup was a first-class cricket competition held in Zimbabwe from 3 March 2000 – 7 April 2000. It was won by Mashonaland, who beat Manicaland in the final having finished second behind them in the league stage of the competition.

Points table

Final

References

2000 in Zimbabwean cricket
Domestic cricket competitions in 1999–2000
Logan Cup